Women's basketball at the 2010 Asian Games was held in Guangzhou from 18 November to 25 November 2010.

Squads

Results
All times are China Standard Time (UTC+08:00)

Preliminary round

Group A

Group B

Placings 5th–6th

Final round

Semifinals

Bronze medal game

Gold medal game

Final standing

References

Results

External links
Basketball results at the official website

women